Geoffrey Ma Tao-li  (born 11 January 1956) is a retired Hong Kong judge who served as the 2nd Chief Justice of the Hong Kong Court of Final Appeal—the court of last resort (or supreme court) in Hong Kong. Between 2001 and 2010, he held various positions in the High Court of Hong Kong, including Chief Judge, Justice of Appeal, and Judge of the Court of First Instance. Before his judicial career, he was a barrister-at-law in private practice at Temple Chambers, and was qualified to practice in England and Wales, Hong Kong, Australia and Singapore.

Early life and education
Ma was born in Hong Kong in 1956, the son of an electrical engineer who was educated at the Engineering Faculty of The University of Hong Kong, but his family originally hails from Tianjin. His ancestors were adherents of the Muslim faith, and his great-grandfather had been the imam in the Muslim community in Shanghai before the war. Mr Ma's parents moved to Hong Kong in the late 1940s, but in the 1960s they moved again to Manchester in the United Kingdom, where he received education at Altrincham Grammar School.  In 1974, he started his studies at the University of Birmingham and graduated with an LLB in 1977.

Legal career
In 1978, Ma was called to the Bar by Gray's Inn in London and commenced his practice as a barrister in England and Wales; he was then called to Bar in Hong Kong, State of Victoria, Australia and Singapore in 1980, 1983 and 1990 respectively. He was appointed Queen's Counsel in 1993. During his time as a barrister, Ma was instructed for many high-profile cases. He represented the Director of Immigration in the right of abode cases. He was Head of Chambers of Temple Chambers in Hong Kong prior to his judicial appointment.

He was appointed by the Hong Kong Judiciary as Recorder of the Court of First Instance of the High Court in December 2000. In December 2001, Ma became a Judge of the Court of First Instance of the High Court. In 2002, Ma was elevated to the position of Justice of Appeal of the Court of Appeal of the High Court. In July 2003, he was appointed as Chief Judge of the High Court.

Ma was also a member of the Working Party on Civil Justice Reform, which came into effect in April 2009 and is aimed at lowering legal costs and improving assess to justice. Addressing almost 200 legal professionals at a forum in April 2010, Ma criticised judges for being too lenient in civil proceedings with time-wasting parties and encouraged judges to fully use their new case management power under the Civil Justice Reform to ensure expediency. He also warned lawyers against devising new tactics to make civil proceedings unnecessarily lengthy and inefficient.

On 8 April 2010, it was announced that the Chief Executive Donald Tsang accepted the recommendation of the Judicial Officers Recommendation Commission to appoint Ma as the successor to the current Chief Justice of the Court of Final Appeal Andrew Li. Ma was succeeded by Andrew Cheung as Chief Judge of the High Court. On 9 June 2010, Ma's appointment was approved by the Legislative Council by a majority vote.

Ma had a number of public appointments, which include serving as an associate member of the London Maritime Arbitrators Association, an honorary lecturer of the Department of Professional Legal Education of the University of Hong Kong, a member of the Criminal and Law Enforcement Injuries Compensation Board, a member of the High Court Civil Court Users Committee, a member of the Hong Kong Futures Exchange Disciplinary Appeal Tribunal, chairman of the Appeal Tribunal Panel (Buildings), deputy chairman of the SFC Appeals Panel, and deputy chairman of the SFC Takeovers Appeals Committee. Ma is a patron of the Bingham Centre for the Rule of Law; he is also a patron of the International Advocacy Training Council. 

He was awarded the Grand Bauhinia Medal in June 2012 by the Hong Kong Government, and the title of Officier de l’Ordre de la Legion d’Honneur was conferred on him by the French Government in 2015. He was elected an honorary bencher of Gray's Inn in 2004, making him the third person in Hong Kong conferred with such honour. He was made an honorary fellow of Harris Manchester College, Oxford in 2012; he also serves as a member of the advisory board of the Commercial Law Centre at the college.

On 15 November 2016, Ma was elected as an Honorary Bencher of the Middle Temple.

In October 2019, Ma announced his intention to step down from his position as Chief Justice in January 2021, when he turns 65.

Since retiring, Ma has returned to private practise as an arbitrator and mediator in Temple Chambers, Hong Kong (where he was Head of Chambers before joining the judiciary), and Brick Court Chambers, London. He has also been appointed as Honorary Professor of both the University of Hong Kong's and the Chinese University of Hong Kong's respective law faculties.

Reception
Legislator and Senior Counsel Audrey Eu and Ronny Tong believed Ma will continue to defend the independence of the Hong Kong judiciary, but described him as sometimes a little too "conservative." Tong cited an appeal from September 2009 when Ma and fellow judges criticised the government for not disclosing information but eventually ruled in favour of an Immigration Department decision to deny entry to Falun Gong practitioners on "security grounds." Also, in December 2008, he was part of a Court of Appeal panel that overturned a lower court ruling that acquitted the operators of Citizens' Radio of unlicensed broadcasting.

Nevertheless, the Hong Kong Bar Association stressed that Ma commands "deep respect" and is "eminently qualified". Similarly, Hong Kong Human Rights Monitor Director Law Yuk-kai said he was pleased to see Ma's rich experience in public law. "He is strong in public law. He has the competence to protect constitutional rights," Law said. "Of course we were disappointed about some cases, but I don't think he is going out of the way to side with the government. I hope he understands that his role is very important. Hong Kong doesn't have democracy. We expect there is at least one branch of government that serves as the last protector of our rights and interests."

After Ma announced his retirement as Chief Justice, Carrie Lam thanked him for his staunch commitment and relentless efforts in safeguarding the rule of law and promoting the international status of the Judiciary, particularly amongst common law jurisdictions. She also commended his sterling contribution in enhancing the efficiency, effectiveness and transparency of judicial administration.

Family
Ma is married to Maria Yuen, who is a Justice of Appeal of the Court of Appeal of the High Court. They have one daughter. To avoid any possible conflict of interest, Ma would not hear appeals from cases in which Yuen has sat. Nor would he deal with any administrative matter concerning her.

References

External links
 馬道立膺格雷律師學院名譽委員
 Justice Ma's biography gov.hk

1956 births
Living people
Chief Justices of the Court of Final Appeal (Hong Kong)
Hong Kong judges
Hong Kong Senior Counsel
Alumni of the University of Birmingham
Hong Kong Queen's Counsel